Coryphasia is a genus of jumping spiders that was first described by Eugène Louis Simon in 1902.

Species
 it contains sixteen species, found in Brazil, Argentina, Jamaica, on the Greater Antilles, and in French Guiana:
Coryphasia albibarbis Simon, 1902 (type) – Brazil
Coryphasia artemioi Bauab, 1986 – Brazil
Coryphasia bulbosa (Tullgren, 1905) – Argentina
Coryphasia campestrata (Simon, 1902) – Brazil
Coryphasia cardoso Santos & Romero, 2007 – Brazil
Coryphasia castaneipedis Mello-Leitão, 1947 – Brazil
Coryphasia fasciiventris (Simon, 1902) – Brazil
Coryphasia furcata Simon, 1902 – Brazil
Coryphasia melloleitaoi Soares & Camargo, 1948 – Brazil
Coryphasia monae (Petrunkevitch, 1930) – Puerto Rico
Coryphasia monteverde Santos & Romero, 2007 – Brazil
Coryphasia nigriventris Mello-Leitão, 1947 – Brazil
Coryphasia nuptialis Bauab, 1986 – Brazil
Coryphasia sanguiniceps (Simon, 1902) – Brazil
Coryphasia septentrionalis (Caporiacco, 1954) – French Guiana
Coryphasia viaria (Peckham & Peckham, 1901) – Jamaica

References

Salticidae genera
Salticidae
Spiders of South America
Spiders of the Caribbean